The Ottawa Valley Curling Association (OVCA) is a regional association for the sport of curling in the Ottawa valley region of Eastern Ontario and Western Quebec.

The OVCA was founded in 1957. It operates a number of bonspiels, most notably the City of Ottawa Men's Bonspiel which occurs every March. It is one of the largest bonspiels in the world, and has been running annually since 1956. In 2010, the open division had 137 teams.

Member clubs
As of September 2019, all OVCA-member clubs were required to become members of the Ontario Curling Association or Curling Quebec.
List last updated Jan 29, 2022.

Lanark County
Almonte Curling Club
Carleton Place Curling Club
Lanark Highlands Curling Club
Pakenham Curling Club
Perth Curling Club 
Smiths Falls Curling & Squash Club

Leeds & Grenville
Brockville Country Club 
Gananoque Curling Club 
North Grenville Curling Club
Prescott Curling Club

Ottawa
Carleton Heights Curling Club
City View Curling Club
Cumberland Curling Club 
Granite Curling Club of West Ottawa 
Huntley Curling Club 
Manotick Curling Centre 
Metcalfe Curling Club
Navan Curling Club 
Ottawa Curling Club 
Ottawa Hunt and Golf Club 
RA Centre
RCMP Curling Club
RCN (Navy) Curling Club
Richmond Curling Club 
Rideau Curling Club

Prescott & Russell
Russell Curling Club 
Vankleek Hill Curling Club

Renfrew County
Arnprior Curling Club
Deep River Curling and Squash Club 
Killaloe Curling Club
Pembroke Curling Centre
Renfrew Curling Rink

Stormont, Dundas & Glengarry
Alexandria Curling Club
Cornwall Curling Centre 
Glengarry Curling Club 
Lancaster and District Curling Club 
Morrisburg Curling Club 
Winchester Curling Club

Quebec
Buckingham Curling Club
Curling des Collines 
Lachute Curling Club 
Shawville Curling Club
Club de curling Thurso

Governor-General's Trophy
The Governor-General's Trophy competition is a dual rink tournament held between the winners of playdowns run between two representatives of the OVCA and Curling Québec. It was established by Lord Dufferin, the Governor General of Canada at the time in 1874 as a dual rink tournament, with the finals played at Rideau Hall until 1939.  The event is run by Canadian Branch Curling.

References

External links
Ottawa Valley Curling Association

1957 establishments in Ontario
Curling in Ottawa
Curling in Ontario
Curling in Quebec
Curling governing bodies in Canada